Arkadiusz Protasiuk (13 November 1974 in Siedlce – 10 April 2010) was a Polish pilot, captain of the Polish Air Force Tu-154 flight to Smolensk on 10 April 2010.

He died in the 2010 Polish Air Force Tu-154 crash near Smolensk on 10 April 2010. He was posthumously awarded the Order of Polonia Restituta.

Awards
  Bronze Medal of Merit for National Defence (2005)
  Bronze Cross of Merit (2007)
  Knights of the Order of Polonia Restituta (2010)

References

1974 births
2010 deaths
Polish Air Force officers
Knights of the Order of Polonia Restituta
Recipients of the Bronze Cross of Merit (Poland)
Victims of the Smolensk air disaster
People from Siedlce